Richard Burdett  (London, 1956) is professor of Urban Studies at the London School of Economics and Political Science (LSE) and the director of LSE Cities and the Urban Age project. 


Biography
His interests and activities focus on the interactions between the physical and social worlds of cities. Professor Burdett is a member of the Mayor of London's Cultural Leadership Board, was a member of Council of the Royal College of Art (RCA) in London and is Trustee of the Norman Foster Foundation. He was the architectural adviser to the Mayor of London from 2001 to 2006 and Chief Adviser on Architecture and Urbanism for the London 2012 Olympics. He was a commissioner on the UK Government's Airports Commission., a member of the US Housing and Urban Development Hurricane Sandy Regional Planning and Design Competition and the Rockefeller Foundation's 100 Resilient Cities initiative. He leads LSE Cities, a global centre of research and teaching at the London School of Economics which was awarded a Queen's Anniversary Prize 2016-2018 for its work on training urban leaders and shaping cities of the future. At LSE, he founded and directs the Urban Age programme, an interdisciplinary investigation of global cities which brings together national and city leaders, academics, designers and civic actors. Burdett acts as a consultant to national and city governments, private developers and philanthropic agencies around the world. He was director of the 2006 Venice Architecture Biennale and curator of the Global Cities exhibition at Tate Modern in London, and was chairman of the Jury for the Mies Crown Hall Americas Prize 2016–2018. He is co-editor of "The Endless City" (2007), "Living in the Endless City" (2011), "Transforming Urban Economies" (2013), "The SAGE Handbook of the 21st Century City" (2017) and "Shaping Cities in an Urban Age" (2018).

Burdett was appointed Commander of the Order of the British Empire (CBE) for services to urban planning and design in the 2017 New Year Honours and awarded an Honorary Fellowship from the Royal College of Art in 2019.

Selected works 
Shaping Cities in an Urban Age, co-editor 
The SAGE Handbook of the 21st Century, co-editor, 2017
 Living in the Endless City, co-editor, 2011
 The Endless City, co-editor, 2007

References

1956 births
Living people
Academics of the London School of Economics
Commanders of the Order of the British Empire
British urban planners
British architects